The 1998 Arkansas gubernatorial election took place on November 3, 1998 for the post of Governor of Arkansas. Incumbent Republican governor Mike Huckabee defeated Democratic nominee Bill Bristow to win a full term in office.

Democratic primary

Candidates
Bill Bristow, attorney
Dirk Anderson, farmer 
Johnny Hoyt, state representative

Results

Republican primary

Candidates
Mike Huckabee, incumbent Governor of Arkansas
Gene McVay, army colonel

Results

General election

Campaign
In the beginning of the race, it was suspected that Republican nominee, incumbent governor Mike Huckabee would have to face a hard-fought election. Huckabee had assumed the office of governor in July 1996 after Jim Guy Tucker resigned over implications of his involvement in the Whitewater affair. Because Huckabee had not yet been elected to the post, and the aftermath of Tucker's resignation had temporarily tarnished the title of Governor, it was deemed the Democratic challenger, Jonesboro attorney Bill Bristow, would be of worthy competition. However, Huckabee's appeal as an honest Southern Baptist minister in the wake of scandal and his brief but high-profile experience opposed to Bristow's lack thereof made him a much more attractive candidate amongst the Arkansas electorate. His well-funded grassroots campaign across all portions of the state and Bristow's lack of support from the Democratic Party, which was more focused on Blanche Lincoln's U.S. Senate race, enabled him to soar in the polls. On election day, Huckabee won the election with nearly 60% of the vote, the largest margin for any Republican Governor of Arkansas since Reconstruction till  Asa Hutchinson’s 2018 election performance of 65.3%.

According to a CNN exit poll, Huckabee received 48% of the African-American vote in his 1998 election; but some experts have questioned whether those numbers are a representative sample on how he did on the whole in the election.

Results

References

1998
Arkansas
Gubernatorial
Mike Huckabee